Bronagh Waugh (born 6 October 1982) is an actress from  Northern Ireland. She played Cheryl Brady in the Channel 4 soap opera Hollyoaks from 2009 to 2013. At the 2010 British Soap Awards, Waugh was nominated for awards for Best Newcomer, Best Actress and Best Comedy Performance for her portrayal of Cheryl. She was also nominated for two National Television Awards. Since leaving Hollyoaks, Waugh has appeared in dramas including The Fall, Unforgotten and the crime drama Ridley.

Personal life
Her father is Canadian and Waugh has Canadian citizenship. She has been an advocate for same-sex marriage in Northern Ireland. On 5 May 2021, Waugh gave birth to a son, her first child.

Filmography

Awards and nominations

References

External links
 

Living people
1982 births
21st-century actresses from Northern Ireland
Film actresses from Northern Ireland
Television actresses from Northern Ireland
Soap opera actresses from Northern Ireland
People from Limavady
People from Coleraine, County Londonderry
LGBT rights activists from Northern Ireland
People from Northern Ireland of Canadian descent